Wilkinson-Dozier House is a historic plantation house located near Conetoe, Edgecombe County, North Carolina. It was built about 1815, and is a two-story, three bay by two bay, Federal style frame dwelling.  The front facade features  a tall, rather delicate double portico with a Chinese Chippendale balustrade.

It was listed on the National Register of Historic Places in 1974.

References

Plantation houses in North Carolina
Houses on the National Register of Historic Places in North Carolina
Federal architecture in North Carolina
Houses completed in 1815
Houses in Edgecombe County, North Carolina
National Register of Historic Places in Edgecombe County, North Carolina